Noida International University , also known as NIU is a private university located in Noida, Uttar Pradesh, India established in the academic year of 2010 and is approved by University Grants Commission and is a member of the Universities (AIU). Also, Noida International University is recognized by national bodies like State Medical University, IAP, NCTE, INC, NPTEL, CoA, BCI etc. Noida International University offers diploma, undergraduate, postgraduate and doctorate level academic programmes in the fields of education, engineering, science, arts, commerce, architecture, law, medical, management and computer applications . A World Class University sponsored by the Maruti Educational Trust. The lush green campus of 75 acres with its uniquely designed architecture stands out as an infrastructure. The campus is strategically located near the Yamuna Expressway educational hub in Gautam Budh Nagar, Greater Noida. The University through its 12 schools is offering various multi-disciplinary  programmes in varied streams of Engineering, Management, Law, Medical and Social Sciences. The students from more than 54 Nations place faith in the educational curriculum of the University.

Academics and Research 
Noida International University offers diploma, undergraduate, postgraduate and doctorate level academic programmes in the fields of education, engineering, science, arts, commerce, architecture, law, medical, management and computer applications. Admission to all other courses is based on the candidate's previous qualifying examination. The selection procedure for the non-technical course is done based on the Group Discussion/Personal Interview. The institute also offers Ph.D. and M.Phil in 11 specializations.NIU also has a 450+ bedded Hospital and a Medical College named Noida International Institute of Medical Sciences (NIIMS).

Schools

Campus  
The university campus is spread over 75 acres on the Yamuna Expressway, Gautam Budh Nagar, Uttar Pradesh.

Student Life 
Noida International University and all its affiliated colleges offer top quality infrastructure facilities, so that the students and faculties can carry out their knowledge exchange ideally, and can live comfortably. The library of Noida International University holds 30000 books and journals. Banking facilities along with a 24 hour ATM is also available inside the campus. Transport facilities in the form of AC and non-AC buses are available. Other facilities available at Noida International University are as follows.

Hostel
Library
Auditorium
IT Infrastructure
Laboratories
Banks Facilities
Medical/Hospital
Transport
Cafeteria
Guest Room

Affiliations  
There are many international and national educational bodies and corporate entities that have collaborated with Noida International University. These tie-ups have been done through MoUs and are aimed at continuous improvement of the educational value that is being provided to the students of Noida International University. Names of some of the many entities that have collaborated with Noida International University are given below:

International Collaborations
New York Institute of Technology, USA	
Fort Hays State University, USA
Ural Federal University (UrFU), Russia
Central College, Canada
University of International Business, Kazakhstan
Missouri State University
Financial And Economical College, Crimea
Swiss Institute for Management and Hospitality, Switzerland
Istanbul Kent Universitesi, Türkiye
Bukhara State Medical Institute , Republic of Uzbekistan.
Yerevan Haybusak University, Armenia
Caucasus University , Georgia
FTP Education, Vietnam
Sonargaon University, Bangladesh
St. George’s University School of Medicine, Grenada
INTI International University, Malaysia
International Medical School, Kazakhstan
Politeknik Aisyiyah Pontianak, Indonesia

National Collaborations
Hindu College of University of Delhi
Shyam Lal College Eve, University of Delhi
Asian School of Media Studies, Uttar Pradesh
Global Alliance World Educational Consortium Bangalore

Rankings 
Noida International University ranked impressively by The National Institutional Ranking Framework (NIRF) and Outlook National Institutional Ranking Framework. Below are the major ranks secured by Noida International University:

Noida International University has been ranked 7th in Uttar Pradesh by education world 2022.
As per India Today 2021 Rankings, NIU got 34th rank in Architecture Category.
Noida International University NIRF Ranking is 491 in 2020.

Gallery

External links 

 

Universities and colleges in Noida
Private universities in Uttar Pradesh